Sarah Tuttle-Singer (born 30 July 1981) is a United States-born media editor. She blogs at The Times of Israel, Kveller, Scary Mommy, Ladies' Home Journal, and TIME.com.

Her writing covers a range of personal topics including parenting, divorce, death, abortion, living under rocket fire, and Jerusalem.

Sarah Tuttle-Singer has written a book, Jerusalem Drawn and Quartered: One Woman’s Year in the Heart of the Christian, Muslim, Armenian, and Jewish Quarters of Old Jerusalem.

Books
Jerusalem Drawn and Quartered: One Woman’s Year in the Heart of the Christian, Muslim, Armenian, and Jewish Quarters of Old Jerusalem  
Included in:

References 

1981 births
Living people
American emigrants to Israel
20th-century American Jews
Israeli Jews
Israeli non-fiction writers
People from Los Angeles
21st-century American Jews